Hemidactylus easai is a species of gecko endemic to India.

References

Endemic fauna of India
Reptiles of India
Hemidactylus
Reptiles described in 2022